The Torpy River is a tributary of the Fraser River, rising in the Northern Rockies and the McGregor Range, a subdivision of the McGregor Plateau, and forming the boundary between the Rockies and the McGregor Plateau.

References

Rivers of British Columbia
Rocky Mountains
Central Interior of British Columbia
Tributaries of the Fraser River
Rivers of the Canadian Rockies
Cariboo Land District